The Chaubunagungamaug Reservation refers to the small parcel of land located in the town of Thompson, Connecticut, close to the border with the town of Webster, Massachusetts and within the bounds of Lake Chaubunagungamaug (Webster Lake) to the east and the French River to the west. The reservation is used by the descendants of the Nipmuck Indians of the previous reservation, c. 1682–1869, that existed in the same area, who now identify as the Webster/Dudley Band of the Chaubunagungamaug Nipmuck. Together with the Hassanamisco Nipmuc, both have received state recognition under the Massachusetts Commission on Indian Affairs.

The reservation only consists of 2.5 acres (1.0 hectare), and does not support a permanent population.  It does serve as a meeting place and cultural center for Webster/Dudley Band of the Chaubunagungamaug Nipmuck. The land is also used as a place for the reinterment of local Native American remains. The tribe, and its reservation, are recognized in Massachusetts, but both lack recognition in Connecticut and at the federal level.

History

Praying Town of Chabanakongkomun

The first attempt at providing land for the Indians was the 'Praying towns' established by the missionary John Eliot, starting with Natick in 1651.  Eliot petitioned the Great and General Court to provide land for the formation of townships, which the colonial government awarded in 1651, in response to the growing population of English settlers, which had doubled through natural increase and large-scale migration.

Eliot, who had already been instrumental in learning the language, translating the Bible, advocating for the Indians and teaching them literacy, settled Indian converts, known as 'Praying Indians,' in these communities.  The Praying towns fell under colonial jurisdiction and laws, and the Praying Indians were forced to adopt many English customs, civil systems Christianity, but were self-governing with most administrative positions filled by the tribal elite, operated in their own language and were able to maintain Native customs.

In 1672, Joseph, son of the Hassanamessit (Grafton, Massachusetts) sachem Petavit (Petuhannit), also known as Robin, began preaching to the Indians of Chabanakongkomun, as Eliot referred to it.  Eliot and Major-General Daniel Gookin, representing the colonial government, visited the area four times between 1668 and 1674.  In 1673, Gookin installed Willymachin, also known as Black James, the sachem of Chabanakongkomun as Constable over four new Praying towns being established nearby.  They returned in 1674, to officially recognize the Praying town with Joseph as its teacher.  The new town did not receive an official land grant as it was still far from English settlements and due to the outbreak of King Philip's War 1675-1676 during Metacomet's uprising against the English.  Chabanakongkomun was abandoned, as many fled to join Metacomet, others served the English as scouts and guides and those that remained were forcibly marched to Deer Island where many died of exposure, starvation and illness.

See also
 Chaubunagungamaug Nipmuck
 Nipmuc
 Nipmuc Nation
 Native American tribes in Massachusetts
 State-recognized tribes
 List of Indian reservations in the United States

References

External links
 Webster man keeps Nipmuc tradition alive - Worcester Telegram
 "Proposed Finding Against Acknowledgment of the Chaubunagungamaug Nipmuck" - Bureau of Indian Affairs
 "Through songs and artifacts, tribe revives a long-lost culture" - Boston
 "Living in Two Worlds" - Boston Harbor Islands
 "Nipmuc History" - First Nations
 "Nipmuc say BIA got the facts wrong" - Indian Country Today
 "Nipmucs will appeal US tribal rejection" - Boston
 "Nipmuc group adds to T&G Santa’s gifts" - Telegram & Gazette

American Indian reservations in Massachusetts
Geography of Worcester County, Massachusetts
Native American tribes in Massachusetts
Nipmuc
Webster, Massachusetts